The Eurovision Dance Contest 2008 was the second and final edition of the Eurovision Dance Contest and was held in Glasgow, Scotland, hosted by the BBC on 6 September. The presenters were, as in the previous edition, Graham Norton and Claudia Winkleman. The contest took place at the SEC Centre.

The winners of contest were Edyta Herbuś and Marcin Mroczek of Poland who achieved a score of 154 points. 2nd place went to Russia, 3rd place to Ukraine, 4th place to Lithuania and 5th place to Azerbaijan who were participating for the first time.

In a change to the rules, professional couples were no longer eligible to enter the contest. At least one dancer from each couple had to be a local celebrity, not professionally trained to dance. A further change was that each couple only performed once. In 2007 each couple performed a ballroom or Latin routine followed by a freestyle dance incorporating national flavour; in the 2008 contest, the latter freestyle dance continued and this time could include elements of traditional Latin and ballroom. A panel of experts was introduced with an approximate weight of 23% of the total outcome and the rest 77% determined through televoting. The highest possible points from the jury were 48 while the televoting cast a maximum of 156 points.

Location 

The SEC Centre is Scotland's largest exhibition centre, located in the district of Finnieston on the north bank of the River Clyde, Glasgow. The venue's holding company SEC Limited, is 91% owned by Glasgow City Council and 9% owned by private investors. It is probably best known for hosting concerts, particularly in Hall 4 and Hall 3.

Since the opening of the original buildings in 1985, the complex has undergone two major expansions; the first being the SEC Armadillo in 1997, and then the OVO Hydro arena in 2013.

The host city and venue was announced by the BBC on 7 July 2008. The contest was attended by an audience of 2,000.

Format

Rules and participants
According to the 2007 rules Section 2.2 on the official website, all entrants in the Eurovision Dance Contest 2007 agreed to take part in 2008 when signing up for the first contest. However, in June 2008, Switzerland announced their withdrawal from the contest without specifying a reason, while Germany also decided to withdraw from the event later the same month, due to comparatively low ratings for the 2007 contest in the country.

The running order was announced on 8 August. Due to a scheduling clash with the 2010 FIFA World Cup preliminaries, the Spanish broadcaster announced its late withdrawal on 28 August, just days before the contest was scheduled to took place. In July, they held a national selection show Quiero Bailar and named singer Rosa López and dancer Nieto as their representatives in the contest. According to the draw they were supposed to be 15th couple to perform.

As the number of dances was reduced, with each couple performing once instead of twice, new countries were allowed to enter the competition, but the only new country to enter the contest was Azerbaijan.

Opening and interval acts

The opening of the show featured Red Hot Chilli Pipers playing a Scottish-flavoured medley of known songs, with all participating couples presented on stage in order of performance. The interval act featured a group dance routine and was followed by soprano Lesley Garrett and the Carousel cast, performing a medley of "June Is Bustin' Out All Over" and "You'll Never Walk Alone" accompanied by the City of Glasgow Chorus.

Controversy
Azerbaijan and Greece announced professional dance couples as their representatives at the Eurovision Dance Contest 2008. According to the regulations of the contest, professional couples were not allowed to take part in the competition. The EBU specified that the couple had to be composed of one professional (defined as a dancer who earns his or her living through dance and dance-related activities), and one non-professional known in a field other than dance. The non-professional was not required to be a celebrity, as long as he or she was known in his field, and it was also not a requirement that the non-professional had no dance experience. Since the representatives for Azerbaijan and Greece both consisted of two professional dancers, however, it is not clear why their entries were considered valid.

Participating countries

Scoreboard
It is worth noting that, had the judges not been introduced (and thus only the televote been used), Poland would still have won the competition by 31 points. However, Ukraine and Russia would have shifted places therefore Ukraine would have finished 2nd and Russia finishing 3rd.

12 points 
The maximum twelve points awarded by each country (to the couple who had received the most phone votes) were allocated as follows:

Professional jury
An expert jury of International DanceSport Federation judges from non-participating countries acted as a jury in the contest. After each performance, each jury member awarded each performance up to 12 points. The jury members were:

 Juror A: Gladys Tay (head judge)
 Juror B: Sven Traut
 Juror C: Barbara Nagode Ambrož
 Juror D: Michelle Ribas

The points below were converted (giving the jury vote the weight of four countries' votes in the total result) into 4 sets of 12 points, 12 for the first place couple on the jury leaderboard, 10 points for second, 8 points for third and so on, down to 1 point for 10th. The other four couples, do not receive any points from the judges.

Spokespersons 
The order in which each country announced their votes was done in order of performance. The spokespersons are shown alongside each country.

 Carin da Silva
 
 Jens Blauenfeldt
 Husniyya Maharramova
 Brian Osmond
 Jaana Pelkonen
 Marcus van Teijlingen
 
 Carol Smillie
 Larisa Verbitskaya
 
 Helena Coelho

Broadcasts 
Most countries sent commentators to Glasgow or commentated from their own country, in order to add insight to the participants and, if necessary, provide voting information.

Among the countries that took part, Albania, Armenia, Belarus, Bosnia and Herzegovina, Cyprus, Macedonia, Iceland, Israel, Malta and Spain also broadcast the event without sending representatives. In accordance with the rules, Spanish broadcaster TVE were obliged to broadcast the contest live due to their late withdrawal as an active participant. The EBU initially confirmed that the event would be broadcast on the network's second channel La 2 "for the benefit of Spanish viewers", however TVE later confirmed it would be delayed by one hour without specifying a reason. Australia also broadcast the contest on 6 May 2009, as a lead up to the Eurovision Song Contest 2009, on SBS. This was the first time Australia had broadcast the Eurovision Dance Contest, after failing to broadcast the 2007 edition, and was aired without any commentary.

Viewing figures

See also 
Eurovision Song Contest 2008
Eurovision Young Musicians 2008
Junior Eurovision Song Contest 2008

References

External links

ESCKaz

2008 competitions
2008 in Europe
2008 in the United Kingdom
Eurovision Dance Contest by year
Events in Glasgow
September 2008 events in the United Kingdom